Campfire Punkrock is the first EP by UK based songwriter Frank Turner. The EP was released via Xtra Mile Recordings on May 15, 2006. The vinyl release includes a live version of "The Ballad of Me and My Friends" and is pressed on a sulfur-yellow 10" vinyl. The EP was recorded at the Oxford home of Frank Turner's bass player (Tarrant Anderson) by his guitarist (Ben Lloyd). It was mixed by Tristan Ivemy who also mixed the Love, Ire and Song album and who helped record and produce Frank Turner's fourth full-length release England Keep My Bones.

Personnel
Frank Turner - Acoustic Guitar / Vocals
Ben Lloyd - Electric Guitar
Nigel Powell - Drums
Tarrant Anderson - Bass

Track listing

Vinyl release track listing

Formats

References

2006 EPs
Frank Turner albums